To Believe is the fifth studio album by the British group The Cinematic Orchestra. It was released on 15 March 2019 through Ninja Tune and Domino. It is the group's first album in 12 years following Ma Fleur (2007), and was supported by a tour in the second quarter of 2019.

As with the group's previous work, it is jazz-inspired and features guests from the "global soul and jazz scene". The lead single, "A Caged Bird/Imitations of Life" featuring Roots Manuva, was released as a limited 12-inch single in independent record stores in January 2019.

Background
Along with collaborations with Moses Sumney, Roots Manuva, Tawiah, Grey Reverend, Heidi Vogel and Dorian Concept, To Believe featured string arrangements by Miguel Atwood-Ferguson. The album was said to feature a "widescreen touch" that "draws on the power" of the band's catalogue by Clash. It was mixed by Tom Elmhirst at Electric Lady Studios in New York.

Track listing

Charts

References

2019 albums
The Cinematic Orchestra albums
Ninja Tune albums
Domino Recording Company albums